WJUN is a sports radio station in the Lewistown, Pennsylvania, market. The station is owned by Kristin Cantrell's Seven Mountains Media, through licensee Southern Belle, LLC.

The station was started by Lewistown Broadcasting under the name Juniata-Perry Broadcasting Co. Lewistown Broadcasting owned WMRF (1490), WLTN-FM (97.9) and had majority ownership of WJSW 1290 and WJSW-FM (100.1) Altoona, PA. WJUN signed on with 250 watts in September, 1955. Staff were DJs Don Lorenz, Tim Palm, Manager Ralph Parker and Engineer Ken Callahan. As a small market station (one of the smallest in PA at the time), the station had very little budget, so all equipment was used. The studio equipment was from the former WLTN-FM, Lewistown, PA, which the company had recently discontinued and returned the license. Tower and transmitter were from WJSW, Altoona which had merged with WVAM after a fire destroyed the WVAM facility in 1951.

In 1957, the power was increased to 1000 watts. In 1970, pre-sunrise operation at 500 watts was authorized. After the FCC authorized nighttime operation for many daytime AM stations, WJUN began nighttime coverage of sports events in 1986.

For the first 25 years, it ran a MOR (middle of the road) format and block programming consisting of country (6 - 7 am, 11 - 12 AM), Gospel 12:45 - 1:00 PM + weekends), Easy listening (5 PM - Sign off), Polka (12:30 - 1:00 PM Sunday) plus paid religion weekdays, weekends. Add to that mix Phillies baseball, Mutual News and the local obituary column.

In 1977, the station was sold to Mid-State Broadcasting, owned by Richard (Tab) Lyons and Bill Berry, both former employees of WKVA, Lewistown, PA. Together, Tab and Bill called their company "Billbat Broadcasting." During their ownership, they modernized much of the equipment and moved the format to a more mainstream Adult-Contemporary and discontinued the block programming. The format included Country hits in rotation but in the era of "urban cowboy", it played well.

The FCC opened an FM allocation in 1986, which Mid-State applied for and was granted in 1987 for a Class A FM on 92.5. However they lacked the funds to construct the permit, so the station and CP were sold to Starview Media who signed on WJUN-FM in July 1988. WJUN soon began running a MOR/Oldies format, switching to ESPN Radio several years later.

Effective November 1, 2018, Starview Media sold WJUN and the translator construction permit to Kristin Cantrell's Seven Mountains Media for $70,500.

External links

JUN (AM)
Sports radio stations in the United States
Radio stations established in 1983